Live at the Wetlands is the first release by Robert Randolph and the Family Band. The live album was recorded at the Wetlands Preserve club in Tribeca, New York City on August 23, 2001 and released on April 9, 2002. The concert was one of the last events held at the Wetlands Preserve before it closed.

Track listing

Personnel
Robert Randolph  – Pedal Steel Guitar, Guitar, Vocals
John Ginty  – B-3 Organ
Danyel Morgan  – Bass Guitar, Vocals
Marcus Randolph  – Drums

References

2002 live albums
Robert Randolph and the Family Band albums
Warner Music Group live albums
Reprise Records live albums